Leisure Class is an American rock band. Formed in Detroit in 1977 as Mr. Unique & the Leisure Suits, the band got their start as the opening act for The Mumps (featuring Lance Loud) and local favorites like Flirt and Destroy All Monsters. They released their debut record, the four-song EP, "Mr. Unique & the Leisure Class" in 1983. Dennis Loren, reviewing it in the Metro Times, found "something to offend everyone",.

The band moved to New York City, making their debut at CBGB in 1984. Venues for the band during this period included CBGB, 8BC, SNAFU, the Henry Street Settlement, the Kitchen, the Gas Station, the Lone Star Roadhouse, Under Acme, Woody's, Beowulf, and Tramps. Their performances featured, at various times, writer Herbert Huncke, impaled goat heads, and a two-story prison (designed and built by conceptual artist and photographer Misha Gordin.

The limited edition two-CD compilation, Leisure Class Recordings 1979–1994 was released in 2004. The following year, Leisure Class was profiled on the National Public Radio show, Day to Day. Lead singer and lyricist Dimitri Mugianis was the subject of the 2009 documentary film by Michel Negroponte, I'm Dangerous With Love. The 2010 compilation Parents Night at the Leper Colony was called "a splendid one hour introduction to this criminally overlooked band".

Lineups

1977–1978
 Dimitri Mugianis – Vocals
 Glenn Johnson (Wild Man Fischer) – Drums, Vocals
 Jeff Mullins – Guitar
 Brian Garwood – Bass
 Ted Moniak (Kevin Renick, Randy Herman and the Sceptre of Benevolence) – Mandolin, Guitar, Vocals

1978–1979
 Dimitri Mugianis – Vocals
 Glenn Johnson – Drums, Organ, Vocals
 James Myers – Guitar, Bass
 Dave Rice (Algebra Mothers, L-Seven, The Blind) – Guitar, Bass
 Ted Moniak – Mandolin, Vocals

1979–1980
 Dimitri Mugianis – Vocals
 Glenn Johnson – Drums, Vocals
 Howard Glazer aka John E. Louder – Guitar
 Bob Godwin aka Scotch Hiballs – Bass

1981
 Dimitri Mugianis – Vocals
 Glenn Johnson – Drums, Percussion, Piano, Vocals
 Dan Porvin – Guitar
 Michael Tudor aka Sal Monella – Guitar
 Greg Gilmore – Bass
 Dan Matuszczak aka Matthew J. Karp – Saxes, Flute, Bass Clarinet
 Stan Johnson – Trumpet

1981–1983
 Dimitri Mugianis – Vocals
 Glenn Johnson – Drums, Percussion, Piano, Organ, Harmonica, Tin Whistle, Vocals
 Dan Porvin – Guitar
 Michael Tudor aka Sal Monella – Guitar
 Chris McGorey (Dog Latin) – Bass
 Dan Matuszczak aka Matthew J. Karp – Saxes, Flute, Bass Clarinet
 Stan Johnson – Trumpet
 Guy Zublin – Trumpet

1984–1989
 Dimitri Mugianis – Vocals
 Glenn Johnson – Drums, Percussion, Piano, Organ, Synthesizers, Tin Whistle
 Dan Porvin – Guitar
 Sal Monella (Michael Tudor) – Guitar
 Marc Dannenhirsch – Guitar 
 Chris Hunt – Guitar
 Dave Boonshoft (John Phillips, Naked Music, Aguilar Amplification) – Bass
 Ric Frank (Jambalaya Brass Band) – Tenor Sax and Flute
 Mike Walters – Tenor Sax and Flute
 J. J. Silva (Ten Wheel Drive) – Trumpet, Trombone
 Leonard Belota – Trumpet
 Leif Arntzen – Trumpet
 Pat McCarty – Trombone
 Paul Romero – Vocals
 Kevin Weist (The Lemmings, The Groove Barbers) – Vocals
 Melissa Schaffer – Vocals
 David Lawton – Vocals

1990–1995
 Dimitri Mugianis – Vocals 
 Glenn Johnson – Drums, Percussion
 Dan Porvin – Guitar
 Al Korosy (Dion) – Guitar
 Dave Boonshoft – Bass
 Bob Marx – Tenor Sax and Flute
 Russ Johnson – Trumpet
 Pat McCarty – Trombone
 Paul Romero – Vocals
 Kevin Weist – Vocals
 David Lawton – Vocals
 Angel Jemmott (Angela on Sesame Street) – Vocals

Discography
 Mr. Unique and the Leisure Class (Leisureco LC 1) 1983
 Leisure Class Recordings 1979–1994 (Leisureco LC 002) 2004
 We Went and Recorded It Anyway: The Best of Pop-Punk and Power Pop 1977–84 (Brutarian: BRUT CD-009) 2009
 Parents Night at the Leper Colony (Leisureco LC 003) 2010

References

External links
 Official Leisure Class website
 Glenn Johnson interviewed November 15, 2009 on Outsight Radio Hours
 Parents Night at the Leper Colony review, I-94 Bar, December 2010
 Parents Night at the Leper Colony review, DisAgreement, May 24, 2011
 Parents Night at the Leper Colony review, MotorCityRocks, June 20, 2011
 I'm Dangerous With Love page from the Internet Movie Database
 Dimitri interviewed on Crimetown podcast, Episode 9, 2019.

Rock music groups from Michigan
Musical groups from Detroit
1977 establishments in Michigan